The 2013 season of the Esiliiga B, the third level in the Estonian football system, was the first season in the league's history. The season officially began on 3 March 2013 and ended on 10 November 2013. However, on 3 March the Estonian Football Association announced that all matches scheduled for 3 March 2013 would be postponed due to heavy snowfall.

Teams

Stadiums and locations

Personnel and kits 

Note: Flags indicate national team as has been defined under FIFA eligibility rules. Players and Managers may hold more than one non-FIFA nationality.

Managerial changes

Results

League table

Promotion play-off 

At season's end, the 3rd place club of the 2013 Esiliiga B will participate in a two-legged play-off with the 8th club of the 2013 Esiliiga for the spot in next year's competition.

Relegation play-off 

At season's end, the 8th place club of the 2013 Esiliiga B will participate in a two-legged play-off with the runners-up of the II Liiga for the spot in next year's competition.

Season statistics

Top goalscorers 

As of 10 November 2013.

Awards

See also 

 2013 Meistriliiga
 2013 Esiliiga
 2012–13 Estonian Cup
 2013–14 Estonian Cup

References 

Esiliiga B seasons
3
Estonia
Estonia